AS Røra Fabrikker is a Norwegian company that is located in Røra in the municipality of Inderøy in Nord-Trøndelag county, Norway.  It is a juice, jam, and processed agricultural product company that is a subsidiary of Coop Norge Industri AS.  Røra Fabrikker, together with a coffee plant and bakery-holding company, form one division of food production within Coop Norge Industri.

The items produced here are shipped and delivered to coöperatives throughout Norway.  There are 49 people employed by the company in 2011. The company was founded in 1938 as the Inntrøndelag Frukt- og Bærsalgslag.  The name was later changed to Trøndefrukt and in 1975 it was changed to its present form.

References

Food and drink companies of Norway
Companies based in Trøndelag
Norwegian brands
Inderøy
Coop Norden